Rimouski Aerodrome  is a registered aerodrome located  northeast of Rimouski, Quebec, Canada. It only handles general aviation and cargo flights.

History 
The aerodrome was constructed in 1927, when the Department of Defence constructed a terminal for the first aerial postal route in Canada. During the 1930s and 1940s, programs to combat unemployment during the Great Depression as well as defence requirements during the Second World War led to the expansion of the aerodrome. In 1946, the City of Rimouski started renting the aerodrome from the federal government. The civilian use of the field would contribute to the rise of Quebecair until 1969.

On 20 April 1999, Transport Canada awarded the airport certificate number 5151-1-Q208.

On 19 April 2002, the city acquired the airport from the federal government. Since then, the city has owned and operated the airport.

In 2017, the airport reverted to the status of registered aerodrome.

Facilities

Operator 
The aerodrome is owned and operated by the City of Rimouski and is considered a registered aerodrome under Canadian Aviation Regulations.

Landing fees are charged. All single engine piston aircraft of less than  registered gross weight and privately registered aircraft (except air ambulance and aircraft over ) according to the Transport Canada civil register are exempt from these fees.

Outside parking fees are charged after 24 hours except for those who have a hangar storage lease. Hangar parking is available by monthly lease or without lease with different rates for resident and non-residents of the city. Flight schools are exempt from hangar fees. Plug-ins are available and billed based on amount of time used.

Services

Fuel 
The aerodrome sells 100LL and Jet-A1 fuels.

Oils 
All seasonal oils are available.

Servicing 
Storage, parking and plug-ins are available as well as a pilot lounge on request.

Ramp 

Terminal 

Hangars 
Two hangars are located at the aerodrome, containing 34,000 square feet of storage space.

Runways 

Runway 07 has right hand circuit traffic.

City staff provide a runway condition report. Pavement load ratings and pavement classification numbers are available.

Lighting 
The runway is served by threshold lighting as well as low intensity runway lights activated by a Type J ARCAL system.

Both runways are also served by PAPIs.

Communication facilities 
The aerodrome is surrounded by a  mandatory frequency area served by the Mont-Joli Flight Service Station. This area is joined to the Mont-Joli mandatory frequency area by a corridor equal to the width of their diameter up to  ASL.

Navigation facilities 
The aerodrome is served by the Rimouski NDB (Ident: YXK, Freq.: 373 kHz), and is in range of the Mont-Joli VOR/DME (Ident.: YYY, Freq.: 115.9 MHz).

Instrument approaches 

 RNAV (GNSS) RWY 07
 RNAV (GNSS) RWY 25
 VOR/DME B

Accidents and incidents
On 29 May 1973, Douglas C-47A, CF-QB,B of Air Gaspé crashed on approach, killing all four people on board.

References

Buildings and structures in Rimouski
Registered aerodromes in Bas-Saint-Laurent